Qixian Temple may refer to:

 Qixian Temple (Mount Wutai), on Mount Wutai, in Wutai County, Shanxi, China
 Qixian Temple (Mount Lu), on Mount Lu, in Jiujiang, Jiangxi, China